Archbishop Holgate's School is a coeducational Church of England secondary school and sixth form with academy status, located in York, North Yorkshire, England.

History
The school was founded as Archbishop Holgate's Grammar School in 1546 by Robert Holgate, the then Archbishop of York. The link between the school and successive Archbishops of York has been continuous throughout the school's history, and as recently as 2004, the Archbishop of York held the post of Chair of Governors for the school.

Grammar School
The original grammar school was in Ogleforth near York Minster. In the 1800s it was referred to as "The Rev. Shackley's School", and Thomas Cooke taught there.

Comprehensive
Until 1985, it was an all-boys' grammar school. With the reorganisation of education in York in 1985, the school changed its name to Archbishop Holgate's School, and became a co-educational [comprehensive] school. During this transition period the outdoor swimming pool was converted to an indoor pool, a new sports hall was built, and upgrades were made to music, design and technology, home economics and other facilities. The school's facilities now include an indoor heated swimming pool, a chapel and a boathouse on the River Ouse. In 2009 a £4.3 million two-storey learning centre with landscaping, parking and bike storage, called the LearningCentre@AHS was built, and now serves as the home of the school's sixth form facilities.

Former headteachers
Recent headmasters have included Donald Frith OBE (1959–1978), Dr J M Frost (1979–1984), and Alan Walker, an old boy and former English teacher at the school (1984–92), all of whom have since died. Dr Frost went on to become principal of the then-New York 6th Form college (now York College (York)), established in the building previously occupied by Ashfield Secondary Modern School, and opened as part of the reorganisation in 1985. The last headmaster was John Harris (1992–2010), who joined the school when it had the lowest results in York, and saw it through expansion from 439 students in 1992 to almost 900 and the best exam results in the school's history before his retirement in 2010. The current headmaster is Andrew Daly, who prior to joining the school, held a position in the senior leadership team at St Wilfrid's Catholic School and Sixth Form College in Wakefield.

Academic performance
In 2007 the school was inspected by Ofsted and was judged as "outstanding". Similar to most secondary schools in York, it gets well above-average GCSE results, with 70% of Year 11 students achieving five or more A*-C grades including English and Maths in 2009 (87% achieved five or more GCSE passes at grade C and above).

Notable former pupils

Archbishop Holgate's Grammar School
Stanley Jevons Professor of Political Economy from 1968–70 at the University of Manchester (1930–7)
James Crossley Bodybuilder and contestant in ITV's The Circle, series 3 
 Wing Commander Les Harland DFC (1931–36)
 Squadron Leader Tony Iveson DFC Royal Air Force Second World War Fighter and Bomber pilot
 Frank Dobson, Labour Party politician
 Richard Philip Douglas CB, chief operating officer since 2001 of the Department of Health (1968–75)
 Paul Grice, Clerk and chief executive of the Scottish Parliament (1972–79)
 Ben Godfrey, English footballer
 Jack Clarke Professional footballer for Sunderland AFC
 Donald Shepherd, Founder of the Portakabin business, subsidiary of Shepherd Building Group (until 1933)
 Andrew Turner, Deputy Mayor of Christchurch, New Zealand (1979-1985)

Arms

References

External links
 Archbishop Holgate's School (official school website)
 Archbishop Holgate's Grammar School website (offering information on the early-to-mid 20th century and early history)
 Archbishop Holgate's Grammar School (offering more information on the last few years)
 
 EduBase

Educational institutions established in the 1540s
1546 establishments in England
Church of England secondary schools in the Diocese of York
People educated at Archbishop Holgate's School
Secondary schools in York
Academies in York